Emerson Pereira da Silva (born 21 August 1973) is a Brazilian former footballer who played as a midfielder.

Club career 
In October 1998 he was signed by Italian club A.C. Perugia.

International career 
He played for the Brazil U20 side in the 1993 FIFA World Youth Championship.

Managerial statistics

Honours
Chiangrai United
Thai FA Cup: 2020–21

References

RSSSF

External links
 Profile at futpedia 

Living people
1973 births
Brazilian footballers
Brazil under-20 international footballers
Brazilian expatriate footballers
Nongbua Pitchaya F.C. managers
Colo-Colo footballers
Unión Española footballers
Esporte Clube Juventude players
A.C. Perugia Calcio players
São Paulo FC players
Botafogo Futebol Clube (SP) players
C.A. Rentistas players
Serie A players
Chilean Primera División players
Brazilian expatriate sportspeople in Chile
Expatriate footballers in Chile
Expatriate footballers in Italy
Association football midfielders
Footballers from São Paulo
Esporte Clube Jacuipense managers
Chiangrai United F.C. managers